Benjamin Wadsworth (February 28, 1670 – March 16, 1737) was an American Congregational clergyman and educator. He was trained at Harvard College (B.A., 1690; M.A., 1693). He served as minister of the First Church in Boston; and as president of Harvard from 1725 until his death.

Wadsworth House

Built in Cambridge, Massachusetts in 1726 for the president of Harvard, Benjamin Wadsworth, and his wife, Wadsworth House has had a long and illustrious history. It is the second oldest building at Harvard (the first being Massachusetts Hall), built on the site where Harvard's earliest building, the Peyntree House, had previously stood. General George Washington, with the assistance of his second-in-command Charles Lee, set up his first headquarters in the house.  It was used as Washington's headquarters from July 2 to July 16, 1775, before transferring to the larger John Vasall House (now the Longfellow House) on Brattle Street.

In Wadsworth House nine Harvard presidents lived from 1726 to 1849. In 1849, when Jared Sparks decided to stay in his nearby home, Harvard presidents ceased to live in Wadsworth House. After that time, Wadsworth House took in student boarders (including Ralph Waldo Emerson '21) and visiting preachers, among others.  The Wadsworth House lost its front yard when Massachusetts Avenue was widened.

Today, the building houses the Office of the University Marshal, the Commencement Office, Prof. Robert Darnton the University Librarian, the Harvard Office for Scholarly Communication (headed by Peter Suber), and several professors.

Anti-abortion writings

In 1712, Wadsworth was one of the first to write about abortion in America, saying those involved either directly or indirectly were guilty of, "murder in God's eyes".

See also
List of Washington's Headquarters during the Revolutionary War

References

Further reading
  

1670 births
1737 deaths
Harvard University faculty
Presidents of Harvard University
People from colonial Boston
American slave owners
Harvard College alumni
Massachusetts colonial-era clergy
People from Milton, Massachusetts
People from Cambridge, Massachusetts